The 6th (United Kingdom) Division is an  infantry division of the British Army. It was first established by Arthur Wellesley, 1st Duke of Wellington for service in the Peninsular War as part of the Anglo-Portuguese Army and was active for most of the period since, including the First World War and the Second World War. The modern division was reformed on 1 February 2008, as a deployable two star Headquarters for service in Afghanistan during Operation Herrick. The division was officially reformed with a parade and flag presentation at York on 5 August 2008 and then disbanded in April 2011.

It was reformed as 6th (United Kingdom) Division from Force Troops Command in August 2019.

Peninsular War
The 6th Division was formed for service in the Peninsular War by Arthur Wellesley, 1st Duke of Wellington, it was present at the Battles of Fuentes de Onoro, Salamanca, Siege of Burgos, Pyrenees, Battle of the Nivelle, Battle of the Nive, Battle of St Pierre, Battle of Orthez, Battle of Tarbes and the Battle of Toulouse.

Formation during the Peninsular War
The order of battle for the Battle of Fuentes de Onoro, May 1811:

 Commanding General: Major General Alexander Campbell
 1st Brigade: Colonel Hulse
 1st/11th Foot
 2nd/53rd Foot
 1st/61st Foot
 1 company, 5th/60th Rifles
 2nd Brigade: Colonel Robert Burne
 1st/36th Foot (2nd Foot at Almeida)
 Portuguese Brigade: Brigadier General Frederick, Baron Eben
 1st/8th Foot Portuguese Line
 2nd/8th Foot Portuguese Line
 1st Portuguese Line Regiments
 2nd/12th Portuguese Line Regiments

The order of battle for the Battle of Salamanca, 22 July 1812:

 Commanding General: Major General Clinton
 1st Brigade: Major General Hulse
 1st/11th
 2nd/53rd
 1st /61st
 1 company of 5th/60th Foot
 2nd Brigade: Colonel Hinde
 2nd Foot
 1st/32nd Foot
 1st/36th Foot

 Portuguese Brigade: Brigadier General de Rezende
 1st and 2nd/8th
 1st and 2nd/12th Portuguese Line
 9th Caçadores

The order of battle in summer 1813 was:
 Commanding General Lieutenant General Sir Henry Clinton
 1st Brigade: Major General Hulse (to November 1812)
 1/11th Foot
 2/53rd Foot
 1/61st Foot
 1 coy., 5/60th Foot
 1st Brigade: Major General Pack (from November 1812)
 1/42nd Foot
 1/79th Foot
 1/91st Foot
 1 coy., 5/60th Foot
 2nd Brigade: Colonel Hinde (to November 1812)
 2nd Foot
 2/32nd Foot
 1/36th Foot
 2nd Brigade: Major General Lambert (from November 1812)
 1/11th Foot
 1/32nd Foot
 1/36th Foot
 1/61st Foot
 1 coy., 5/60th Foot
 Portuguese Brigade: Brigadier General de Rezende
 1/8th Portuguese Line
 2/8th Portuguese Line
 1/12th Portuguese Line
 2/12th Portuguese Line
 9th Caçadores
The order of battle for the Battle of Toulouse, 10 April 1814:

Commanding General Lieutenant General Sir Henry Clinton
 1st Brigade: Major General Pack
 1/42nd Foot
 1/79th Foot
 1/91st Foot
 1 coy., 5/60th Foot
 2nd Brigade: Major General Lambert
 1/11th Foot
 1/32nd Foot
 1/36th Foot
 1/61st Foot
 1 coy., 5/60th Foot
 Portuguese Brigade: Brigadier General Douglas
 1/8th Portuguese Line
 2/8th Portuguese Line
 1/12th Portuguese Line
 2/12th Portuguese Line
 9th Caçadores

First World War
The 6th Division was a Regular Army division that was sent to France on 9 September 1914. It served on the Western Front for the duration of the First World War, first seeing action in the First Battle of Ypres as part of III Corps.

In 1915 the division moved into the Ypres Salient to relieve troops that had fought in the Second Battle of Ypres. The Salient was relatively quiet for the rest of the year, except for an attack on the chateau at Hooge on 9 August.

At the end of July 1916 the division was withdrawn, having suffered 11,000 casualties, and in September it was attached to XIV Corps where it joined in the Battle of the Somme by attacking the German fortification known as the Quadrilateral. It captured this area on 18 September. They then participated in the attacks on Morval and Le Transloy before being withdrawn on 20 October and moved into Corps Reserve. Total casualties on the Somme were 277 officers and 6,640 other ranks. In November the division moved to the relatively quiet La Bassée sector, and in March 1917 it went to the Loos sector where it conducted operations and trench raids around Hill 70.

It was withdrawn on 25 July, shortly before the final assault on the hill. From reserve, it then went to take part in the Battle of Cambrai as part of III Corps. Four days after the battle ended, the division was withdrawn to rest at Basseux. By February 1918 the division was manning the Lagnicourt Sector and was there on 22 March when the Germans launched their Spring Offensive which drove the division back and caused 3,900 casualties out of its 5,000 infantry. On 25 March the division was withdrawn to the Ypres Salient again as part of the Second Army.

By September the division was part of IX Corps and took part in the Battle of Épehy, participating in the general attack on St Quentin and The Quadrilateral (not the same as the position of the same name attacked at the Somme (see above)) that began on 18 September and ended with the Quadrilateral's capture on the 25th.

The division's last two major assaults of the war were in October. On the 8th they captured Bohain and on the 18th they took the high ground overlooking the Sambre–Oise Canal that prepared the way for the Battle of the Sambre.

First World War formation

9 September 1914
The 6th Division embarked for France on 8 and 9 September. It was commanded by Major-General J. L. Keir, with Colonel W. T. Furse as GSO 1. Brigadier-General W. L. H. Paget commanded the Royal Artillery, and Lieutenant-Colonel G. C. Kemp commanded the Royal Engineers.

16th Infantry Brigade (Brigadier-General E. C. Ingouville-Williams)
1st The Buffs (East Kent Regiment)
1st The Leicestershire Regiment
1st The King's (Shropshire Light Infantry)
2nd The York and Lancaster Regiment
17th Infantry Brigade (Brigadier-General W. R. B. Doran)
1st The Royal Fusiliers (City of London Regiment)
1st The Prince of Wales's (North Staffordshire Regiment)
2nd The Prince of Wales's Leinster Regiment (Royal Canadians)
3rd The Rifle Brigade (The Prince Consort's Own)
18th Infantry Brigade (Brigadier-General W. N. Congreve)
1st The Prince of Wales's Own (West Yorkshire Regiment)
1st The East Yorkshire Regiment
2nd The Sherwood Foresters (Nottinghamshire and Derbyshire Regiment)
2nd The Durham Light Infantry
Divisional Troops
Mounted Troops
C Squadron, 19th (Queen Alexandra's Own Royal) Hussars
6th Cyclist Company
Artillery
II Brigade RFA
21st Battery, RFA
42nd Battery, RFA
53rd Battery, RFA
XXIV Brigade RFA
110th Battery, RFA
111th Battery, RFA
112th Battery, RFA
XXXVIII Brigade RFA
24th Battery, RFA
34th Battery, RFA
72nd Battery, RFA
XII (Howitzer) Brigade RFA
43rd (Howitzer) Battery, RFA
86th (Howitzer) Battery, RFA
87th (Howitzer) Battery, RFA
24th Heavy Battery, RGA
Engineers
12th Field Company, RE
38th Field Company, RE

Later in the War

 16th Infantry Brigade 
 1st Battalion, Buffs (East Kent) Regiment
 1st Battalion, King's (Shropshire Light Infantry)
 2nd Battalion, York and Lancaster Regiment
 8th (Service) Battalion, Bedfordshire and Hertfordshire Regiment (from 71st Bde. November 1915, disbanded February 1918)
 1st Battalion, Leicestershire Regiment (to 71st Bde. November 1915)
 1/5th Battalion, Loyal North Lancashire Regiment (from February 1915 to June 1915)

 17th Infantry Brigade (until 14 October 1915) 
 1st Battalion, Royal Fusiliers
 1st Battalion, Prince of Wales's (North Staffordshire Regiment)
 2nd Battalion, Prince of Wales's Leinster Regiment (Royal Canadians)
 3rd Battalion, Rifle Brigade (Prince Consort's Own)
 1/2nd (City of London) Battalion, London Regiment (from February 1915)

The brigade transferred to the 24th Division in October 1915, swapping with the 71st Brigade.

 18th Infantry Brigade 
 1st Battalion, West Yorkshire Regiment
 1st Battalion, East Yorkshire Regiment (until November 1915)
 2nd Battalion, Durham Light Infantry
 11th (Service) Battalion, Essex Regiment (from 71st Bde. October 1915)
 2nd Battalion, Sherwood Foresters  (to 71st Bde. October 1915)
 14th (Service) Battalion, Durham Light Infantry (from November 1915, disbanded February 1918)
 1/16th (County of London) Battalion, London Regiment (until February 1916)

 19th Infantry Brigade (until 31 May 1915) 
 2nd Battalion, Royal Welsh Fusiliers
 1st Battalion, Cameronians (Scottish Rifles)
 1/5th Battalion, Cameronians (Scottish Rifles)
 1st Battalion, Middlesex Regiment
 2nd Battalion, Argyll and Sutherland Highlanders

Originally an independent brigade before being attached to the division, the 19th Brigade moved to the 27th Division in May, 1915 and was not replaced, reducing the division to the standard three infantry brigades.

 71st Infantry Brigade (from 11 October 1915) 
 9th (Service) Battalion, Norfolk Regiment
 9th (Service) Battalion, Suffolk Regiment (disbanded February 1918)
 8th (Service) Battalion, Bedfordshire Regiment (to 16th Bde. November 1915)
 11th (Service) Battalion, Essex Regiment (to 18th Bde. October 1915)
 1st Battalion, Leicestershire Regiment (from 16th Bde. November 1915)
 2nd Battalion, Sherwood Foresters (from 18th Bde. October 1915)

The brigade joined from the 24th Division in October 1915, swapping with the 17th Brigade.

 Royal Field Artillery
 II Brigade, RFA
 XXIV Brigade, RFA

 Royal Engineers
 12th Field Company RE
 509th (1st London) Field Company RE
 459th (2/2nd West Riding) Field Company RE

Second World War

During the Second World War the division did not fight as a complete formation. On 3 November 1939 it was formed in Egypt by the redesignation of the British 7th Infantry Division, under the command of Major-General R.N.O'Connor. On 17 June 1940 Divisional H.Q. became H.Q. Western Desert Force. The Division effectively ceased to exist. The Division reformed in Egypt on 17 February 1941, under the command of Major-General John Evetts. From 7 to 19 April it was temporarily under command of Brigadier C.E.N. Lomax.

On 18 June, when command of the allied forces fighting in the Syria-Lebanon Campaign on the southern front were reorganised, the divisional HQ was placed under Australian I Corps to command the remnants of Gentforce (5th Indian Infantry Brigade and 1st Free French Light Division). Two days later the division was joined from Egypt by 16th Infantry Brigade and on 29 June by 23rd Infantry Brigade. Gentforce force captured Damascus on 21 June. Despite intense efforts Vichy forces maintained control of the position and the main allied effort was switched to the advance on the coast.

On 29 September 1941 Major-General Evetts left and Brigadier G.N.C. Martin took acting command. Eleven days later on 10 October that year it was redesignated the 70th Infantry Division, and Major-General Ronald Scobie assumed command.

Order of battle Second World War
 Royal Scots Greys (2nd Dragoons) 25 Mar – 30 May 40

Artillery
 60th (North Midland) Field Regiment, Royal Artillery 20 Jul – 30 Sep 41
  
Engineers
 2nd Field Company, Royal Engineers 19 Feb – 30 Apr 41 & 29 Jun – 9 Oct 41
 12th Field Company, Royal Engineers 20 May – 7 Jun 40, 5 Mar – 6 Apr 41 & 15 Jun – 9 Oct 41
 54th Field Company, Royal Engineers 6 Mar – 7 Apr 41 & 11 Aug – 9 Oct 41
 219th Field Park Company, Royal Engineers 29 Jul – 9 Oct 41
 6th Divisional Signals Regiment, Royal Corps of Signals 3 Nov 39 – 7 Jun 40 & 1 Mar 41 – 9 Oct 41

22nd Infantry Brigade

6 Division 3 Nov 39 – 11 Mar 40 & 10 – 17 Jun 40

 2nd Battalion, Scots Guards
 1st Battalion, Queen's Own Royal West Kent Regiment
 1st Battalion, Welch Regiment
 2nd Battalion, Highland Light Infantry

22nd Guards Brigade

6 Division 17 Feb – 6 Apr 41

 2nd Battalion, Scots Guards
 3rd Battalion, Coldstream Guards
 1st Battalion, Durham Light Infantry

14th Infantry Brigade

6 Division 29 Mar – 30 May 40 & 10 Jul – 9 Oct 41

 2nd Battalion, York and Lancaster Regiment
 2nd Battalion, Black Watch (Royal Highland Regiment)
 2nd Battalion, Kings Own Royal Regiment (Lancaster)
 1st Battalion, South Staffordshire Regiment
 14th Infantry Brigade Anti Tank Company

16th Infantry Brigade

6 Division 23 Mar – 7 Jun 40

 2nd Battalion, Queen's Royal Regiment (West Surrey)
 2nd Battalion, Leicestershire Regiment
 1st Battalion, Argyll and Sutherland Highlanders
 16th Infantry Brigade Anti Tank Company

23rd Infantry Brigade

6 Division 29 Jun – 9 Oct 41

 2nd Battalion, Black Watch
 4th Battalion, Border Regiment
 Czechoslovak 11th Infantry Battalion
 23rd Infantry Brigade Anti-Tank Company

21st century
On 26 July 2007 the Secretary of State for Defence announced that a new 'HQ 6 Division' would reform to direct the International Security Assistance Force's Regional Command South in Afghanistan. Des Browne said 'In order to meet these temporary demands we have decided to augment the forces’ command structure, and will temporarily establish an additional 2-Star deployable HQ. It will be based in York and will be known as HQ 6 Division, with a core of 55 Service personnel, drawn from existing structures. We will keep our planning assumption under review but currently we assess this HQ will be established until 2011.' Major General J D Page OBE took command of the new HQ with effect from 1 February 2008.

The new divisional headquarters, Headquarters 6th (United Kingdom) Division, marked its formation with a parade and flag presentation in York 5 August 2008. It had a clear focus on preparing brigades for Afghanistan and was based at Imphal Barracks, Fulford, York. During summer 2009, the divisional headquarters was significantly reinforced and transformed into Combined Joint Task Force 6 before deploying to Afghanistan as Regional Command South in November 2009. 
The division headquarters closed in April 2011.

Afghanistan War Formation
(November 2009)
Regional Command South – Kandahar Airfield
 3rd Battalion, Royal Regiment of Scotland – regional reserve
Task Force Helmand – British 11th Light Brigade
 The Light Dragoons
 1st Battalion, Coldstream Guards
 1st Battalion, Grenadier Guards 
 2nd Battalion, Yorkshire Regiment
 3rd Battalion, The Rifles
 Danish Battle Group 8
Task Force Kandahar – Canadian 1st Mechanized Brigade Group
 1st Battalion, 12th Infantry Regiment
 1st Battalion, Princess Patricia's Canadian Light Infantry
Task Force Leatherneck – US 2nd Marine Expeditionary Brigade
 Regimental Combat Team 7 
 2nd Light Armored Reconnaissance Battalion
 3rd Battalion, 4th Marine Regiment
 1st Battalion, 5th Marine Regiment
 2nd Battalion, 8th Marine Regiment 
Task Force Uruzgan – Dutch 11th Airmobile Brigade
 1st Battalion, Royal Australian Regiment
 17th Armored Infantry Battalion
 Australian Special Operations Task Group
Task Force Zabul –  Romanian 2nd Mountain Brigade
 280th Infantry Battalion
Task Force Stryker - US 5th Brigade Combat Team, 2nd Infantry Division
 8th Battalion, 1st Cavalry Regiment
 2nd Battalion, 1st Infantry Regiment
 1st Battalion, 17th Infantry Regiment
 4th Battalion, 23rd Infantry Regiment

2019 reformation

Force Troops Command was renamed as 6th (United Kingdom) Division on 1 August 2019, and formed up with sub-units consisting of 1st Signal Brigade, 11th Signal Brigade, 1st Intelligence Surveillance and Reconnaissance Brigade, 77th Brigade and the Specialised Infantry Group. As of 16 October 2020, 11th Signal Brigade has reassigned from 6th Division to 3rd Division as of 16 October 2020. It will sit alongside restructured 1st UK Division and 3rd UK Division under the Field Army.

In later August 2021, the Specialised Infantry Group was redesignated as the Army Special Operations Brigade.

See also

 List of commanders of the British 6th Division
 List of British divisions in World War I
 List of British divisions in World War II

References

Bibliography

 

'Orders of Battle Volume I United Kingdom and Colonial Formations and Units in the Second World War 1939–1945', Lieutenant Colonel HF Joslen. Her Majesty's Stationery Office, 1960.

External links 
 
 The British Army in the Great War: The 6th Division
 A Short History of the 6th Division in WW1

Infantry divisions of the British Army in World War I
Infantry divisions of the British Army in World War II
Military units and formations of the United Kingdom in the Peninsular War
British military units and formations of the Napoleonic Wars
Military units and formations of the British Empire in World War II
Organisations based in Wiltshire
Army 2020
Military units and formations established in 1812
Military units and formations established in 1914
Military units and formations disestablished in 1919
Military units and formations established in 1939
Military units and formations disestablished in 1940
Military units and formations established in 1941
Military units and formations disestablished in 1941
Military units and formations established in 2008
Military units and formations disestablished in 2011
Military units and formations established in 2019